Drip or Drown 2 is the debut studio album by American rapper Gunna, released on February 22, 2019, by YSL Records and 300 Entertainment. It serves as the sequel to his 2017 EP Drip or Drown with American producer Wheezy. The album features guest appearances from Lil Baby, Young Thug, and Playboi Carti. It also features production by Wheezy and Turbo, among others.

Singles
The album's first single, "One Call", was released on February 1, 2019, as well an accompanying music video. The single peaked at number 56 on the US Billboard Hot 100.

The album's second single, "Speed It Up", was released on February 11, 2019. The single peaked at number 91 on the Billboard Hot 100.

Critical reception

Drip or Drown 2 was met with generally positive reviews. At Metacritic, which assigns a normalized rating out of 100 to reviews from professional publications, the album received an average score of 76, based on six reviews.

Riley Wallace of Exclaim! gave a positive review, stating, "Ultimately, Gunna sticks to his guns and delivers a solid effort that lives up to all the hype. He may not be the most innovative MC, but he continues to craft great bodies of work, which is what will cement his career, at the end of the day". Ben Beaumont-Thomas of The Guardian said, "The result is a gentle, poised record: the perfect rap album for a bruised America". Jon Caramanica from The New York Times enjoyed the album, saying, "Gunna has a penchant for rapping over beats that include guitar, like on "Richard Millie Plain", but he doesn't use them for rock scabrousness. Instead, they're caressing, soft-edged beds, elegant accompaniment for a rapper who makes his points with textures more than words. That said, there is a tenderness that peeks through here, not just in the gentleness of the sing-rapping, but also in some of the lyrics". HipHopDX critic Scott Glaysher said, "This album is a big win for Gunna, an even bigger win for executive producers Wheezy and Turbo but a championship win for contemporary rap as a whole that should be appreciated by all".

Sheldon Pearce of Pitchfork wrote, "His bars vary from the goofy ("She made me bust a nut, that's a starburst") to the confusingly profound ("Time is poured on me when I ride that Maybach"), but it's his ability to apply his signature inflection to just about any rhythm he conjures up that can make Drip or Drown 2 nearly hypnotizing". In a mixed review, Highsnobiety critic Mike Vinti wrote the following: "Though it sags in places with materialism and Gunna's melancholy flow, at its best, his charm shines through. Stronger than any of his mixtapes or EPs, Drip or Drown 2 is a promising debut album filled with hints of talent yet to be fully realized on record."

Commercial performance
Drip or Drown 2 debuted at number three on the US Billboard 200 with 90,000 album-equivalent units (including 7,000 in pure album sales) in its first week. This became Gunna's second US top ten debut. In its second week, the album dropped to number eight on the chart, earning an additional 42,000 units that week. In its third week, the album remained at number eight on the chart, earning another 31,000 units that week. In its fourth week, the album dropped to number 10 on the chart, earning 27,000 units, bringing its four-week total to 190,000 units. On November 13, 2019, the album was certified gold by the Recording Industry Association of America (RIAA), for combined sales and album-equivalent units of 500,000 total units. By May 2019, it had sold 10,000 copies in pure album sales in the United States.

Track listing

Notes
  signifies an uncredited co-producer

Personnel
Credits adapted from Tidal.

Performers
 Gunna – primary artist
 Lil Baby – featured artist 
 Young Thug – featured artist 
 Playboi Carti – featured artist 

Technical
 Turbo – engineer , mixer 
 Arin "DJ AJ" Fields – engineer 
 Fabian Maraciullo – mixer 
 Alex Tumay – mixer 
 Bainzz – engineer 
 Nia "Ivy" Mills – assistant engineer 
 Colin Leonard – mastering enginneer 

Miscellaneous
 Young Thug – executive producer
 Turbo – executive producer
 Wheezy – executive producer

Charts

Weekly charts

Year-end charts

Certifications

References

2019 debut albums
Gunna (rapper) albums
YSL Records albums
Sequel albums